Lion Star Fund is a hedge fund headquartered in New York City and registered in the British Virgin Islands. It stems from the Lion Star Family Fund, a family office that has shown consistent rates of return. The fund primarily trades and invests in currencies, the indices of developed countries, and commodities like metals.

History

From 2006 to 2013, the fund averaged a realized return of 45.4% per year with a win rate above 80%. By the second year of operation, the family office had earned an additional $213,000 on their original investment for a total of $713,000. In 2010, that total was over $3 million. They produced their highest rate of return (48.9%) in 2013 and, by 2014, they had earned over $10 million in investment capital. The Lion Star Family Fund has been recognized by TheStreet.com and other publications for outperforming larger hedge funds like The Blackstone Group and KKR & Co.

The firm has been described as "notoriously private," but, in 2014, they founded the Lion Star Fund to attract outside investors. The fund is registered in the British Virgin Islands and is only available to non-American investors as a way to avoid legislative barriers from the U.S. government and the U.S. Securities and Exchange Commission. They are due to begin accepting clients in 2014.

References

External links
 

Financial services companies established in 2014
Hedge fund firms of the United States